Antonio Ramírez Martínez (born 23 November 1986), commonly known as Toño, is a Spanish professional footballer who plays as a goalkeeper for Racing Rioja CF.

Club career
Born in Logroño, La Rioja, Toño was a Valvanera CD youth graduate. In the summer of 2005, after making his senior debut for the football team of the University of the Basque Country, he moved to Real Sociedad and was assigned to their reserves in the Segunda División B.

Toño made his first-team debut on 14 June 2009, coming on as a first-half substitute for Javi Ros in a 1–1 Segunda División home draw against Levante UD as the starter Eñaut Zubikarai was sent off. In July 2009 he was loaned to CD Tenerife from La Liga, but appeared exclusively for the B side also in the third tier.

In June 2011, after another campaign at Sanse, Toño was definitely promoted to the main squad as third choice to Claudio Bravo and Zubikarai. After making no competitive appearances, he signed for division two club CD Guadalajara.

Toño appeared sparingly for the Castile-La Mancha team, also suffering administrative relegation. On 16 August 2013, he joined Cultural y Deportiva Leonesa in the third division.

On 25 June 2014, Toño moved abroad for the first time in his career, signing for AEK Larnaca FC in Cyprus. He started during the vast majority of his spell, beating competition of Alexandre Negri and compatriot Mikel Saizar.

On 23 June 2016, Toño returned to Real Sociedad after agreeing to a two-year contract. Completely barred by Gerónimo Rulli, he only made his official debut on 26 October of the following year, keeping a clean sheet in a 1–0 away win over Lleida Esportiu in the round of 32 of the Copa del Rey.

Toño's first appearance in the Spanish top division took place on 27 January 2018 (at the age of 31 years and two months), in a 4–2 defeat at Villarreal CF. On 28 June, he returned to AEK for a second spell.

Toño returned to Spain in summer 2021, with Racing Rioja CF of the newly-formed Segunda División RFEF.

Honours
AEK Larnaca
Cypriot Super Cup: 2018

References

External links
Real Sociedad official profile

1986 births
Living people
Sportspeople from Logroño
Spanish footballers
Footballers from La Rioja (Spain)
Association football goalkeepers
La Liga players
Segunda División players
Segunda División B players
Segunda Federación players
Real Sociedad B footballers
Real Sociedad footballers
CD Tenerife B players
CD Guadalajara (Spain) footballers
Cultural Leonesa footballers
Racing Rioja CF players
Cypriot First Division players
AEK Larnaca FC players
Spanish expatriate footballers
Expatriate footballers in Cyprus
Spanish expatriate sportspeople in Cyprus